The FM1957 is a Swedish prototype battle rifle based on the Ag m/42 semi-automatic rifle. Along with the FN FAL, M14 rifle, Rk 60 and GRAM 63 battle rifle, it was in competition to replace the bolt action Mausers and the Ag m/42B rifles in Swedish service during the early 1960s but lost over the Heckler & Koch G3 (license built as the Ak 4 in Sweden). The FM57 therefore never entered serial production. The rifle was built in two calibers: the 6.5×55mm (standard in the Swedish Armed Forces at the time) and the 7.62×51mm NATO (which later replaced the 6.5 mm cartridge in Swedish service).

See also
List of battle rifles
GRAM 63 battle rifle

External links
 Swedish military assault rifles 1945 - 1990, Ak4 and Ak 5.

7.62×51mm NATO battle rifles
Rifles of Sweden
Trial and research firearms of Sweden